McCarrons Lake is a lake in Ramsey County, in the U.S. state of Minnesota.

McCarrons Lake was named after John E. McCarron, a pioneer who settled near the lake.

See also
List of lakes in Minnesota

References

Lakes of Minnesota
Lakes of Ramsey County, Minnesota